Arag Khan Malek (also Romanized as Ārag Khān Malek) is a village in Margan Rural District, in the Central District of Hirmand County, Sistan and Baluchestan Province, Iran. At the 2006 census, its population was 28, in 5 families.

References 

Populated places in Hirmand County